Ponerorchis alpestris is a species of flowering plant in the family Orchidaceae, native to Taiwan.

Taxonomy
The species was first described in 1935 by Noriaki Fukuyama as Amitostigma alpestre. A molecular phylogenetic study in 2014 found that species of Amitostigma, Neottianthe and Ponerorchis were mixed together in a single clade, making none of the three genera monophyletic as then circumscribed. Amitostigma and Neottianthe were subsumed into Ponerorchis, with this species becoming Ponerorchis alpestris.

References

alpestris
Flora of Taiwan
Plants described in 1935